Image development can refer to:

Corporate image development – a process known as branding or positioning
Imaging science – creating and developing images, mainly using signal processing methods
Graphic image development – creating and developing graphic images, using visual art skills
Illustrating – developing and rendering graphic images
Photography – capturing and developing photographic images
Image editing – editing graphic images, in contrast to capturing or creating graphic images from scratch
3-D modeling – creating and developing 3D computer generated graphic images from wireframe modeling
Handicraft – fabricating graphic images by hand